Aalankam is an upcoming Indian Malayalam-language film directed by  Shani Khader starring Lukman Avaran, Jaffer Idukki, Sharanya R and Gokulan MS. The film is scheduled to be released in March 2023.

Plot 
Aalankam, according to the film's creators, it's a mystery thriller and the actors are portraying a grey shade characters and the movie is said to be a 'Garish Macabre'.

Cast 
  Sudhi Koppa
 Jaffer Idukki
  Lukman Avran
 Deepak Parambol
 Sharanya R
 Sajesh Nambiar
 Gokulan M S

Production 
The film is produced by Shaji Amabalath and Betty Sathish Raval under the banner Ziad India Entertainments Pvt Ltd.

Development 
The title of the film, Aalankam,  was announced on 25 October 2021 by the makers of the film. The  first-look poster, featuring Lukman Avaran, Jaffer Idukki and Gokulan MS was released on 25 october 2021. A suspense thriller that dwells through the life of gangsters.

Release 
The trailer was released on 25 December 2022 and the film is scheduled for release on March 10 2023.

References

External links 
 

Upcoming Malayalam-language films
Upcoming Indian films
Indian thriller films